Gryfia (island) (til 1945 German Greifen - Werft) – river island in Szczecin situated in area of Szczecin's Harbour "Gryfia" between  West Oder river and Przekop Mieleński. On this area are located beautiful historic buildings of German and underwater boats shipyard.

External links 
 View from Basilica
 Article about history of Gryfia Island
 Article about remainings of Gryfia Shipyard

Neighbourhoods of Szczecin